Jarrod Murphy is a British Formula One aerodynamicist. He is currently the aerodynamics director at the Mercedes AMG Petronas Motorsport Formula One team.

Biography
Murphy started his career in motorsport as a stress analyst for the Benetton F1 team in 1996. He then moved into CFD (Computer Fluid Dynamics), becoming the head of CFD at Renault in 2006. In 2013 he moved to Mercedes to become the chief aerodynamicist before becoming the head of aerodynamics at Mercedes in 2017. In July 2021 he was promoted to Aerodynamics Director covering a broader remit and effectively replacing Mike Elliott who was promoted to technical director.

Career timeline
 Head of CFD Application – Renault F1 (2002-2006)
 Head of CFD – Renault F1 (2006-2011)
 Head of CFD – Lotus F1 (2012-2013)
 Chief aerodynamicist – Mercedes F1 (2013-2017)
 Head of aerodynamics – Mercedes F1 (2017-2021)
 Aerodynamics Director - Mercedes F1 (2021-)

References

Living people
Formula One designers
Aerodynamicists
British motorsport designers
21st-century British engineers
Year of birth missing (living people)
Mercedes-Benz in Formula One
Benetton Formula